The 2016 Euro RX of Latvia was the eighth round of the forty-first season of the FIA European Rallycross Championship. The event was held at the Biķernieku Kompleksā Sporta Bāze in Riga, Latvia as an undercard to the 2016 World RX of Latvia and was contested by the Supercar (fifth and final round) and Super1600 (fourth round) classes. It was the first ever European Rallycross round held in Latvia.

Supercar

Heats

Semi-finals
Semi-Final 1

Semi-Final 2

Final

Standings after the event

Supercar standings

TouringCar standings

 Note: Only the top five positions are included for both sets of standings.

References

|- style="text-align:center"
|width="35%"|Previous race:2016 Euro RX of Barcelona
|width="35%"|FIA European RallycrossChampionship2016 season
|width="35%"|Next race:2016 Euro RX of Germany

Latvia
Euro RX